Anna Alexandrovna Shulgina (born June 21, 1993, in Moscow, Russia) is a Russian film and stage actress, folk-rock-singer and television presenter.

Biography 
Born in Moscow on June 21, 1993, in the family of the singer Valeriya and composer Alexander Shulgin.

In 2009, she graduated from the Moscow central school with in-depth study of specific subjects. In the same year he entered the Boris Shchukin Theatre Institute. In 2013 she made her debut as a television presenter in the program Our way on the TV channel Russia-1.

In 2014 she released her first single, “Give a Shance to Dream” in collaboration with the young hip-hop artist SLEM.

References

External links
Official website
Анна Шульгина

1993 births
Living people
Russian pop singers
Singers from Moscow
Actresses from Moscow
21st-century Russian actresses
Russian film actresses
Russian television actresses
Russian television presenters
21st-century Russian singers
21st-century Russian women singers
Russian women television presenters